Nieborów  is a village in the administrative district of Gmina Hyżne, within Rzeszów County, Subcarpathian Voivodeship, in south-eastern Poland.

The village has an approximate population of 360.

References

Villages in Rzeszów County